Brierly is a surname. Notable people with the surname include:

 Amy Brierly (born 1989), British Paralympian
 Cornelia Brierly (1913-2012), American architect
 David Brierly (1935-2008), English actor
 Justin W. Brierly (1905-1985), American educator and lawyer
 Oswald Walters Brierly (1817-1894), English marine painter

See also 
 Brierly Brook, a community in Nova Scotia
 Brierley (disambiguation)